Taiwan News (formerly China News) is an English-language online newspaper and former print newspaper in Taiwan. It is owned by foods company I-Mei Foods, which also publishes the Chinese-language news weekly of the same name.

History
China News was founded on 6 June 1949 in Taipei by James Wei, a journalist with close ties to the KMT and former employee of the Ministry of Information. The newspaper was established to cater for foreign residents and the local population in Taiwan. At the time it was the only English-language daily newspaper in Taiwan and it was a newspaper published in the afternoon. Later on, in order to compete with its new competitor, China News had to change and was published in the morning in order not to lose its advertisements.

In 1960, the newspaper switched to block printing in a full-size page format.

Wei left the newspaper in 1965. Wei was also a Reuters correspondent and deputy director of the Central News Agency. During his later years he was the sixth Director of the Government Information Office, serving from October 31, 1966, to June 1, 1972. Wei was a close advisor to Chiang Ching-kuo.

China News ran into financial difficulties in 1996 and received capital injection from I-Mei Foods, but the management of the newspaper was unchanged. In May 1999, I-Mei Foods acquired 50 percent stake in the newspaper for NTD$60 million (US$1.8 million). The newspaper's name was changed to Taiwan News to reflect the newspaper's new focus on readers in Taiwan and to avoid confusion with China Daily and China News Service. After the change in ownership, Taiwan News increased its page count and lowered staff wages. Under the ownership of I-Mei Foods, Simone Wei became the newspaper's chairperson and I-Mei CEO Kao Chih-ming became the publisher.

By 1998, 63 percent of Taiwan News''' readership were local readers and the rest were businesspeople, diplomats, academics, teachers and students from outside Taiwan. Former editor Anthony Lawrance said in 2001 that Taiwan News mainly republished wire stories and had few articles with original reporting due to a lack of financial resources to hire English-speaking journalists and produce good translations from Chinese news articles, the high turnover of foreign editorial staff and the absence of an English speaking environment in Taiwan.Taiwan News printed its last print edition on 30 September 2010.

 Editorial position 
Under the ownership of I-Mei Foods, which is strongly associated with the Taiwanese identity, Taiwan News changed its editorial stance from being pro-KMT to being in favor of the Pan-Green coalition and Taiwan independence. According to former editor Anthony Lawrance, Taiwan News opposes autocracies and the People's Republic of China. In the late 1990s, Taiwan News rejected Chinese unification as advocated by the KMT and associations of Taiwan with the People's Republic of China under the "one country, two systems" principle.

 Controversies 
On 5 February 2020, Taiwan News published an article claiming that Tencent may have accidentally leaked the real numbers of death and infection from the COVID-19 pandemic in mainland China. The article, referenced by other news outlets such as the Daily Mail and widely circulated on Twitter, Facebook and 4chan, sparked a wide range of conspiracy theories that the screenshot indicates the real death toll instead of the ones published by health officials. The author of the original news article defended the authenticity and newsworthiness of the leak on a WION program.

See also
 Media of Taiwan

References

External links
 Taiwan News''
 

English-language newspapers published in Taiwan
Online newspapers with defunct print editions
1949 establishments in Taiwan
Mass media in Taipei
Publications established in 1949